Emirate of Çemişgezek (13th century–1663) was a hereditary and autonomous Kurdish emirate existing from the 13th century to 1663, centered around Çemişgezek including Mazgirt, Pertek and Sağman. The emirate was populated by both Muslims and non-Muslims, and moreover had a significant Kurdish Alevi population which flourished and expanded due to the secured self-governance under Ottoman rule, despite Ottoman antagonism towards the minority. Beside Kurds, the emirate had a Bozulus population.

History 
During the Mongol invasion and that of Qara Yusuf of the Qara Qoyunlu, the region around Çemişgezek remained under the control of the Kurdish Malkishi tribe who claimed descent from the Abbasids. When the Aq Qoyunlu under Uzun Hasan entered Kurdistan, the Malkishi tribe was a target since they had been faithful to the Qara Qoyunlu and the Kharbandalu Turkmens were thus sent to Çemişgezek to fight the Kurds. However, the Malkishi resisted successfully. After this, the Malkishi submitted themselves to Ismail I of the Safavids who replaced their leader with an Safavid governor. The Kurdish-Turkmen rivalry over land worsened as Qizilbash dominance increased with the appointment of the Turkmen Qizilbash Khan Muhammad Ustajalu to Diyarbakir which pushed the Kurdish lords of Çemişgezek and other areas to revolt, just before the arrival of the Ottomans.

In the summer of 1515, Idris Bitlisi had, on behalf of the Ottoman Empire, mobilized a Kurdish army including from Çemişgezek to fight the Aq Qoyunlu and the Safavids to recapture Diyarbakir. The Kurdish army was joined by Ottoman troops from Amasya marching together towards Diyarbakir and succeeded in capturing the city by mid-September same year. The army subsequently went on to capture Mardin, and crushed the Qizilbash in Kızıltepe in 1516. The Kurds played a crucial role in the victory and were rewarded richly by Bıyıklı Mehmed Pasha who would become the first governor of Diyarbekir Eyalet and fostered good relations with the Kurds in the region. Diyarbekir Eyalet would include the Emirate of Çemişgezek. The Emirate of Çemişgezek was one of only two Kurdish emirates mentioned in a defter in 1518, the other being Çermik.

Kurdish historian Sharafkhan Bidlisi wrote in Sharafnama that the ruler of Çemişgezek Haci Rustem Beg supported Ismail I in the early 1500s which he was executed for by the Ottoman Empire. Haci Rustem Beg was the last strong ruler of the emirate and the Ottomans appointed a governor to rule the emirate after his death. The Ottoman Sultan Selim I handed over the emirate to Pir Huseyin, the son of Haci Rustem Beg, after he had given his formal submission to the Sultan. After the death of Pir Huseyin, his sixteen sons fought each other which meant that Sultan Suleiman the Magnificent had to intervene. The Sultan moreover incorporated the revenue of Çemişgezek town, the poll-tax of non-Muslims (haraç), the sheep tax (adet-i ağnam) and the entire revenue of the villages that looked promising into the imperial domains. The remaining timar and ziamet were divided between each son and the land thus remained hereditary. In 1597, by the time Bidlisi wrote Sharafnama, the family was still in control over the region.

In 1663, the emirate was abolished and Çemişgezek town was made into a muqata'ah administered by a governor (voivod).

See also 

 List of Kurdish dynasties and countries
Emirate of Hasankeyf

Notes

Bibliography 

 
 

 

 

Former Kurdish states in Turkey
History of Tunceli Province
Safavid Iran
Kurdish dynasties
Vassal states of the Ottoman Empire
States and territories disestablished in 1663
States and territories established in the 13th century